Petr Aleksandrovich Moiseev (born 7 March 1986 in Podolsk) is a Russian bobsledder who has competed since 2006. His best World Cup finish was third twice the four-man event during the 2008–09 season.

Moiseev also finished ninth in the four-man event at the FIBT World Championships 2008 in Altenberg, Germany.

He crashed out during the four-man event at the 2010 Winter Olympics in Vancouver.

References

1986 births
Bobsledders at the 2010 Winter Olympics
Bobsledders at the 2014 Winter Olympics
Living people
Olympic bobsledders of Russia
People from Podolsk
Russian male bobsledders
Sportspeople from Moscow Oblast